This is a list of the best-selling albums in Spain that have been certified by the Productores de Música de España (PROMUSICAE). PROMUSICAE is in charge of certifying records in Spain. Until October 2005, the certification levels for albums in Spain were 50,000 for Gold and 100,000 for Platinum. The current levels, however, are 20,000 for Gold and 40,000 for Platinum.

Of the 20 best selling albums in Spain, Spanish artists dominate the list with fourteen entries. Two Italian artists and one artist each from the United Kingdom, United States, Cuba and Mexico complete the list. Four acts - Alejandro Sanz, La Oreja de Van Gogh, Mecano, and David Bisbal - appear more than once in the list.

Alejandro Sanz tops the list with his fifth album Más, selling around 2.2 million copies in the country and being certified 22 times. The best-selling non-Spanish language album in Spain is Spice by Spice Girls, which sold 1 million copies.

Best-selling albums of all-time in Spain 

The following are the top best-selling albums in Spain based in certifications from PROMUSICAE. Spanish artists are in bold.

See also
 Productores de Música de España
 List of best-selling singles in Spain
 List of best-selling albums

References 

Spain
Spanish music-related lists